{{Infobox film
| name           = 'Til Madness Do Us Part
| image          = 'Til Madness Do Us Part poster.jpg
| caption        = Film poster
| native_name      = 
| director       = Wang Bing
| producer       = 
| writer         = Wang Bing
| editing        = Adam Kerby, Wang Bing
| music          = 
| distributor    = Icarus Films
| cinematography = Wang Bing, Liu Xianhui
| released       = {{Film date|df=y|2013|09|04|Venice|ref1=<ref>{{cite web|url=https://variety.com/2013/film/global/venice-film-review-til-madness-do-us-part-1200610004/|title=Venice Film Review: Til Madness Do Us Part'|date=13 September 2013|publisher=|accessdate=20 May 2020}}</ref>}}
| runtime        = 228 minutes
| country        = China
| language       = Mandarin
}}Til Madness Do Us Part is a 2013 Chinese documentary film directed by Wang Bing. It observes the daily activity on one floor of a Chinese mental institution in Yunnan, Southwest of China. It premiered at the 70th Venice International Film Festival.

The floor of the Chinese mental institution houses 50 male patients who are there for killing someone, committing a crime against a public official, or have a developmental disability. It is not clearly stated why the men are in the mental institution, adding to the observational approach of the documentary. The documentary film uses handheld camerawork and digital video to capture the relationship between society and individuals. Towards the end of the film, one of the patients is allowed to return to his home village. It creates a contrast to the isolation and atmosphere of the mental institution.

ReceptionSlant Magazine'' said, "Whether in terms of filmmaking or indeed reality itself, it’s hard to think of a more quietly radical proposition than the one Wang is making here: There’s compassion to be found in even the harshest of circumstances; it’s all about knowing where to look."

Festivals 
The documentary was shown at the following festivals
 2013 Venice Film Festival
 Winner, 2013 Festival des 3 Continents of Nantes
 2013 Toronto Film Festival
 2013 Rio Film Festival
 2013 Busan Film Festival
 2013 DocLisboa
 2013 Viennale
 2013 Golden Horse Festival
 2014 Rotterdam Film Festival
 2014 Goteborg Film Festival
 2014 Hong Kong Film Festival
 2014 Sydney Film Festival
 2014 Edinburgh Film Festival
 2014 Melbourne Film Festival
 2014 Geneva Film Festival

References

External links
 

Chinese documentary films
2013 films
2010s Mandarin-language films
2013 documentary films
Films directed by Wang Bing